Wonder Valley is a sparsely populated unincorporated community in the Morongo Basin of Southern California's High Desert region, straddling Amboy Road and State Route 62 in San Bernardino County, California, United States, approximately  east of the city of Twentynine Palms.

Geography and climate
Wonder Valley occupies the gently sloping basin between the Sheep Hole Mountains and Bullion Mountains to the north and the Pinto Mountains to the south. State Route 62 and Amboy Road both pass through Wonder Valley; most other roads in the community are unpaved.

Due to its low elevation relative to other communities of the Morongo Basin, Wonder Valley lies near the intersection of the higher-elevation Mojave Desert and the lower-elevation Colorado Desert.  Wonder Valley's subtropical desert climate is characterized by very hot summers and cool winters with considerable diurnal temperature variation throughout the year.  Moisture from the North American Monsoon contributes to summer precipitation and thunderstorm activity, and most non-monsoonal precipitation can be attributed to winter Pacific storms.

Infrastructure

Local
Wonder Valley is unincorporated and is under the jurisdiction of San Bernardino County. Residents of Wonder Valley are served by San Bernardino County's County Service Area (CSA) 70M, a special services district with taxing authority that provides residents with fire protection, park, and road maintenance services.

State and federal representation

History
Wonder Valley was not substantively populated until the United States Congress approved the Small Tract Act (STA) of 1938, a homesteading law that facilitated the leasing and public-to-private transfer of ownership of parcels of up to five acres to United States citizens willing to improve the land by developing a residence, business, or recreational structure.

Thousands of cabins and other structures built by homesteaders, particularly during a period of popularity in the 1950s and 60s, have since been left abandoned.  Although a cleanup effort in the early 2000s resulted the demolition of hundreds of abandoned structures, numerous structures built by Small Tract Act homesteaders still exist in various states of use and repair.

More recently, Wonder Valley has earned a reputation for being a fashionable destination for artists, a trend which is frequently attributed to Wonder Valley's association with nearby Joshua Tree National Park.

References

External links
 Wonder Valley CSA
 Jackrabbit Homestead, a project by Kim Stringfellow

Census-designated places in San Bernardino County, California
Census-designated places in California